was a Japanese football player. He played for Japan national team.

Club career
Kanda played for Osaka SC was founded by his alma mater high school graduates and many Japan national team players Shiro Azumi, Fukusaburo Harada, Usaburo Hidaka, Toshio Hirabayashi, Setsu Sawagata, Kikuzo Kisaka, Yoshio Fujiwara, Shumpei Inoue, Yoshimatsu Oyama, Toshio Miyaji, Uichiro Hatta, Sakae Takahashi and Kiyonosuke Marutani  were playing in those days.

National team career
In May 1923, Kanda was selected Japan national team for 1923 Far Eastern Championship Games in Osaka. At this competition, on May 23, he debuted against Philippines. This match is Japan team first match in International A Match. He also played at 1925 Far Eastern Championship Games in Manila. He played 4 games for Japan until 1925. But Japan lost in both matches.

Kanda died on May 9, 1970.

National team statistics

References

External links
 
 Japan National Football Team Database

Year of birth missing
1970 deaths
Doshisha University alumni
Japanese footballers
Japan international footballers
Association football midfielders